Magnus Rudolph Hestenes (February 13, 1906 – May 31, 1991) was an American mathematician best known for his contributions to calculus of variations and optimal control. As a pioneer in computer science, he devised the conjugate gradient method, published jointly with Eduard Stiefel.

Biography

Born in Bricelyn, Minnesota, Hestenes graduated with a B.S. in 1927 from St. Olaf College and with an M.A. in 1928 from the University of Wisconsin–Madison. He earned his Ph.D. at the University of Chicago in 1932 under Gilbert Bliss.  His dissertation was titled "Sufficient Conditions for the General Problem of Mayer with Variable End-Points."  After teaching as an associate professor at Chicago, in 1947 he moved to a professorship at UCLA.  He continued there until his retirement in 1973, and during that time he served as department chair from 1950–58.  While a professor, Hestenes supervised the thesis research of 34 students, among them Glen Culler, Richard Tapia and Jesse Wilkins, Jr.

Hestenes received the Guggenheim (1954) and Fulbright awards, was a vice president of the American Mathematical Society, and was an invited speaker at the 1954 International Congress of Mathematicians in Amsterdam.

He is the father of mathematician and physicist David Hestenes.

He died on May 31, 1991 in Los Angeles, California.

Selected publications
  (M.A. thesis)

References

External links
 
 Obituary in the Numerical Analysis Digest

1906 births
1991 deaths
St. Olaf College alumni
University of Wisconsin–Madison alumni
University of Chicago alumni
University of California, Los Angeles faculty
20th-century American mathematicians
Burials at Pacific View Memorial Park